Mike Redwine (born May 19, 1964) is a former college football coach.  He served as the head football coach at MidAmerica Nazarene University in Olathe, Kansas from 1991 to 2000 and Howard Payne University in Brownwood, Texas from 2005 to 2007, compiling career college football coaching record of 66–69–2.

Coaching career

MidAmerica Nazarene
Redwine was the head football coach at the MidAmerica Nazarene University in Olathe, Kansas for 10 seasons, from 1991 to 2000, and compiling a record of 53–52–2.  His teams made two appearances in the Victory Bowl, in 1997 and 1999, losing both games.  They also played in the Wheat Bowl for 1995 and 1998, winning and losing one game each.

Howard Payne
Redwine was the 19th head football coach for the Howard Payne University in Brownwood, Texas, serving for three seasons, from 2005 to 2007.  His coaching record at Howard Payne was 13–17.

Head coaching record

College

References

1964 births
Living people
Howard Payne Yellow Jackets football coaches
MidAmerica Nazarene Pioneers football coaches